Matheus Antonio Souza dos Santos (born 8 June 1995), commonly known as Matheus Pato, is a Brazilian professional footballer who plays as a forward for Liga 1 club Borneo Samarinda.

Career statistics

Club

Honours
Individual
 Indonesia President's Cup Top Scorer: 2022

References

1995 births
Living people
Brazilian footballers
Brazilian expatriate footballers
Association football forwards
2. Liga (Slovakia) players
Campeonato Brasileiro Série C players
Campeonato Brasileiro Série B players
K League 2 players
Liga 1 (Indonesia) players
Fluminense FC players
S.L. Benfica footballers
FC ŠTK 1914 Šamorín players
Tupi Football Club players
Cuiabá Esporte Clube players
Daejeon Hana Citizen FC players
Borneo F.C. players
Brazilian expatriate sportspeople in Portugal
Expatriate footballers in Portugal
Brazilian expatriate sportspeople in Slovakia
Expatriate footballers in Slovakia
Brazilian expatriate sportspeople in South Korea
Expatriate footballers in South Korea
Brazilian expatriate sportspeople in Indonesia
Expatriate footballers in Indonesia
People from Rio Branco, Acre
Sportspeople from Acre (state)